The Riich G6 is a full-size car manufactured by the Riich division of the Chinese company Chery Automobile from 2010 to 2013,  with prices ranging from 189,800 yuan to 259,800 yuan.

Features

Riich G6 Paramount limousine
A limousine version called the Riich G6 Paramount limousine was unveiled during the 2011 Shanghai Auto Show.The limousine was based on the regular Riich G6 and was stretched by more than two meters to a total length of 7.2 meters with room for seven occupants. Power comes from the standard 2.0L turbo with 158hp.

References

External links

G6
Full-size vehicles
Cars of China
Cars introduced in 2010
2010s cars